The Okot  River is a river of eastern Uganda in eastern Africa. It flows in a southern and south-westerly direction and eventually, via a tributary, reaches Lake Kyoga.

Rivers of Uganda